Francesco Bianchi may refer to:

 Francesco Bianchi (bishop) (1606–1644), Roman Catholic bishop
 Francesco Bianchi (composer) (1752–1810), Italian operatic composer
 Francesco Bianchi (painter) (1447–1510), Italian painter of the Renaissance
 Francesco Bianchi (medallist) (1842–1918), Italian medallist in the Vatican
 Francis Bianchi (1743–1815), Italian saint
 Francesco Bianchi (athlete) (1940–1977), Italian athlete